Verandalux–Dries was a Belgian professional cycling team that existed in 1984 and 1985. The team participated in the 1985 Tour de France.

References

Cycling teams based in Belgium
Defunct cycling teams based in Belgium
1984 establishments in Belgium
1985 disestablishments in Belgium
Cycling teams established in 1984
Cycling teams disestablished in 1985